George Cadbury (19 September 1839 – 24 October 1922) was the third son of John Cadbury, a Quaker who founded Cadbury's cocoa and chocolate company in Britain. He was the husband of Dame Elizabeth Cadbury.

Background
He worked at the school for adults on Sundays for no pay, despite only going to school himself until he was fifteen. Together with his brother Richard he took over the family business in 1861 and founded the chocolate producer Cadbury Brothers. In 1878 they acquired 14 acres (57,000 m2) of land in open country, four miles (6 km) south-west of Birmingham, where they opened a new factory in 1879. He rented 'Woodbrooke' – a Georgian style mansion built by Josiah Mason, which he eventually bought in 1881. On this site, he founded in 1903 a Quaker higher educational institution for social-service oriented education – an institution that still functions as the Woodbrooke Quaker Study Centre.

In the early 20th century, he and John Wilhelm Rowntree established a Quaker study centre in the building, and it remains the only such centre in Europe today, offering short educational courses on spiritual and social matters to Quakers and others. He also created a hospital in Normandy called "l'hopital de Normandy".

The Cadbury brothers were concerned with the quality of life of their employees and provided an alternative to grimy city life. As more land was acquired and the brothers moved the factory to a new country location, they decided to build a factory town (designed by architect William Alexander Harvey), which was not exclusive to the employees of the factory. This village became known as Bournville after the nearby river and French word for "town". The houses were never privately owned, and their value stayed low and affordable. Bournville was a marked change from the poor living conditions of the urban environment. Here, families had houses with yards, gardens, and fresh air. To the present, the town offers affordable housing.

The brothers cared for their employees; they both believed in the social rights of the workers and hence they installed canteens and sport grounds. Nineteen years after brother Richard died, George opened a works committee for each gender which discussed proposals for improving the firm. He also pressed ahead with other ideas, like an annuity, a deposit account and education facilities for every employee.

In 1901, disgusted by the imperialistic policy of the Unionist Government dominated by Colonial Secretary Joseph Chamberlain, and opposed to the Boer War, Cadbury bought the Daily News and used the paper to campaign for old age pensions and against the war and sweatshop labour.

George Cadbury was one of the prime movers in setting up The Birmingham Civic Society in 1918. Cadbury donated the Lickey Hills Country Park to the people of Birmingham. He also donated a large house in Northfield to the Birmingham Cripples Union that was used as a hospital from 1909. It is now called the Royal Orthopaedic Hospital.

He died at his home, Northfield Manor House, on 24 October 1922, aged 83.

Family life
George Cadbury married twice. In London, Middlesex, on 14 March 1872 he married Mary Tylor (born March 1849 at Stamford Hill, London; died June 1887 at Newton Abbot in Devon), daughter of Quaker author Charles Tylor and wife Gulielma Maria Sparkes. She was the mother of George Jr, Mary Isabel, Edward, Henry, and Eleanor Cadbury.

In Peckham Rye, Southwark, London, on 19 June 1888 he married Elizabeth Mary Taylor. They had six children together: Laurence John, George Norman, Elsie Dorothea, Egbert, Marion Janet, and Ursula.

Legacy
The George Cadbury Carillon School was opened in 2006 and is the only carillon school in the United Kingdom.

George Cadbury has a miniature locomotive named after him, originally owned by the husband of his daughter Elsie Dorothea.

Biography
 Walter Stranz: George Cadbury: An Illustrated Life of George Cadbury, 1839-1922 (Shire Publications, Aylesbury, 1973)

References

 "Burke's Peerage and Baronetage"

External links

 Encyclopædia Britannica George Cadbury
 former residence of George Cadbury
 Letter from George Cadbury in England to William Cooper in Australia, 1920

1839 births
1922 deaths
English Quakers
Cadbury
English industrialists
British newspaper publishers (people)